Parliamentary elections were held in Estonia between 15 and 17 May 1926. Before the elections, the electoral law was changed to create more stability by introducing a system of bonds and raising the electoral threshold to require a party to win a minimum of two seats.

Results

See also
III Riigikogu

References

External links
III Riigikogu valimised : 15.-17. mail 1926 Riigi Statistika Keskbüroo

Parliamentary elections in Estonia
Estonia
1926 in Estonia